"Frozen" (also known as "Coast Is Clear") is Curve's second single/EP. It was released on 13 May 1991 and it reached #34 in the UK singles chart. All four songs from the EP were included in the compilation Pubic Fruit, issued in 1992.

"Frozen" was selected as Single of the Week by both Melody Maker and NME.

Track listing

12" & CD
"Coast Is Clear" – 4:00
"The Colour Hurts" – 4:34
"Frozen" – 3:58
"Zoo" – 3:50

7" & MC
"Coast Is Clear" – 4:00
"Frozen" – 3:58

Music video
The video for "Coast Is Clear" features the official members of the band and the touring members performing this song. It was filmed in black and white. Some scenes have applied a blue filter.

Credits
 Written by Toni Halliday and Dean Garcia
 Recorded at TODE by Curve
 Produced by Curve and Steve Osborne
 Mixed by Alan Moulder at Swanyard
 Additional Recording at Eastcote Studios
 Engineer: Ingo Vauk
 Mix Assistant: Ronan Tal
 Painting: J.P. Wombbaby
 Sleeve Design: Darda

Charts

References

1991 EPs
Curve (band) EPs